The Besermyan, Biserman, Besermans or Besermens are a numerically small Permian people in Russia.

The Russian Empire Census of 1897 listed 10,800 Besermans. There were 10,000 Besermans in 1926, but the Russian Census of 2002 found only 3,122 of them.

The Besermyan live in the districts of Yukamenskoye, Glazov, Balezino, and Yar in the northwest of Udmurtia. There are ten villages of pure Besermyan ethnicity in Russia, and 41 villages with a partial Besermyan population.

History 
The Besermyan are of Turkic origin, and are probably the result of a group of Volga Tatars who were assimilated by the Udmurts. In the 13th century during his travel to Mongolia, papal envoy Plano Carpini claimed that the Besermyan were subjects of the Mongols. Russian chronicles sometimes made mention of the Besermyan but it's unclear whether the term was meant to denote the modern group as it was a common derivation of the term "musulman" (Muslim). It is likely that the term had broader usage before it became an ethnonym.

Culture 
The language of the Besermyan is a dialect of the Udmurt language with Tatar influences. Although they speak a dialect of Udmurt, the Besermyan consider themselves a distinct people.

Some Besermyan traditions differ from other Udmurtian customs due to the Islamic influence during the Volga Bulgaria and Khanate of Kazan periods.

The Besermyan used to historically practice their own indigenous religion. According to scholar Shirin Akiner, most current Besermyan practice Sunni Islam. Some Besermyan also practice Christianity. The Russians began converting the Besermyan to Christianity around the middle of the 18th century.

References

 kominarod.ru: Бесермяне 

Udmurtia
Udmurt people
Ethnic groups in Russia
Permians